The Waszp is an Australian, single-handed, hydrofoiling sailboat that was designed by Andrew McDougall as a one-design racer for youth and adults, and first built in 2016.

The design was named 2017 Best One-Design in Sailing World's Boat of the Year Awards.

Production
The design has been built by McConaghy Boats of Mona Vale, New South Wales, Australia since 2016 and remains in production. 750 boats had been built by May 2019 and more than 1,000 by 2022.

Design
The Waszp is a racing sailing dinghy, with the hull built predominantly of infused epoxy. It has a free-standing catboat rig, a concave plumb stem, a vertical transom, an aluminum frame-mounted, transom-hung, hydrofoil rudder controlled by a tiller and a retractable, aluminum, hydrofoil daggerboard. It has folding hiking wings and displaces .

For sailing the design is equipped with variable angle hiking wings to adjust to skill level.

The Waszp is similar to the developmental Moth class, but as a one-design class with aluminum foils it is half the price and thus appeals to a wider group of sailors.

Operational history
The design is an accepted one-design class in the United States. US Sailing, describes it as "a singlehanded, one-design foiler. Designed by Andrew McDougall, the Waszp offers affordable foiling on a robust boat. The class has a place for everyone; there is a large contingent of sailors who race the boat at a high level while other sailors keep the boat at their local yacht club and go for a rip around the bay!"

The first regatta held in the US was in January 2017, at the Upper Keys Sailing Club in Florida and attracted eight boats and sailors.

A February 2017 review in Sail1Design noted, "the Waszp and the Moth are similar in their concepts, but for a couple reasons, the Waszp hits a market of different dinghy sailors. First, the Waszp is half the price of the Moth, you can buy a brand new Waszp in the US for $12,500. Unlike the Moth the Waszp is a one design class. With the Waszp you have adjustable wing angles allowing you to adjust for your skill and for storage. The Waszp comes with retractable alloy foils making it an easy boat to launch. With a free standing rig, you can rig up quickly and have a much easier time getting back into the boat after capsizing."

See also
List of sailing boat types

Similar sailboats
Moth (dinghy)

References

External links

Dinghies
2010s sailboat type designs
Catboats
One-design sailing classes
Sailboat type designs by Andrew McDougall
Sailboat types built by McConaghy Boats